J. Edward "Ted" Richard is a former territorial level politician, lawyer and senior judge of the Supreme Court of the Northwest Territories. Richards, a former lawyer, was a partner in the law firm of Richard, Vertes, Peterson & Schuler in Yellowknife, Northwest Territories. He practised private law until 1988.

Richard was first elected to the Northwest Territories Legislature in the 1987 Northwest Territories general election. He won the Yellowknife South electoral district defeating incumbent Lynda Sorensen.

Richard was also appointed to serve as a judge in the Court of Appeal of Nunavut.

References

Members of the Legislative Assembly of the Northwest Territories
Living people
People from Yellowknife
Judges in the Northwest Territories
Judges in Nunavut
Year of birth missing (living people)